Nanocochlea is a genus of minute freshwater snails with an operculum, aquatic gastropod mollusks in the family Hydrobiidae.

Species
Species within the genus Nanocochlea include:
 Nanocochlea monticola
 Nanocochlea parva
 Nanocochlea pupoidea

References

 Nomenclator Zoologicus info

 
Hydrobiidae
Taxonomy articles created by Polbot
Freshwater molluscs of Oceania